Apotekernes Fællesindkjøp was a Norwegian wholesaler company owned by the pharmacies that provided them with healthcare products. The company was bought in 1992 by the state owned Norsk Medisinaldepot who at the time was the sole wholesaler of pharmaceuticals in the country.

References

Wholesalers of Norway
Pharmacies of Norway
Companies based in Oslo
Retail companies established in 1913
Retail companies disestablished in 1992